Alvarado Park Lake is a reservoir in Johnson County, Texas  southwest of Alvarado, Texas.
The county-owned reservoir was built in 1966 by Jack P. McKinney for floodwater retention, municipal water storage, and recreation.
It is controlled by the City of Alvarado.

The lake is formed by damming the Turkey Creek, a tributary of Chambers Creek and the Trinity River.
The water is stained to murky due to sediment.

Fish populations
The predominant species of fish include:

Largemouth bass
Channel catfish
White bass
Crappie
On November 22, 2021, Waco Inland Fisheries District built constructed small freshwater reef using four PVC pipes for the purpose of luring sportfish allowing anglers have a easier catching experience.

Recreational uses
Boating
Water skiing
Fishing
Swimming
Picnicking
Birdwatching

A public boat ramp is located on the north side of the lake as well as a private residential boat ramp on the southeast side. The northside public boat ramp is open all year and fee-free. Contact City of Alvarado for overnight or weekend use.

No overnight camping is permitted.

References

External links

Reservoirs in Texas
Protected areas of Johnson County, Texas
Bodies of water of Johnson County, Texas